Colour by Numbers is an interactive light installation inside a tower in Telefonplan in the Midsommarkransen area, Sweden.

Tower 

Colour by Numbers was installed between 2006 and 2007 at the LM Ericsson building in Telefonplan, Stockholm. Anyone can control the light by downloading an app, then control the lights inside the tower.

References 

Buildings and structures in Sweden